Agnes Joy is a 2019 Icelandic drama film directed by Silja Hauksdóttir. It was selected as the Icelandic entry for the Best International Feature Film at the 93rd Academy Awards, but it was not nominated.

Plot
A mother with a boring job has to deal with her rebellious daughter.

Reception 
The film won the 2020 Edda film award for best Icelandic film and received five other Eddas, including for Katla M. Þorgeirsdóttir as best female lead.

Cast
 Donna Cruz as Agnes Joy
 Þorsteinn Bachmann as Einar
 Þórey Birgisdóttir as Afgreiðslukona snyrtistofu
 Arnmundur Ernst Björnsson as Erlendur
 Ebba Katrín Finnsdóttir as Dr. Þuríður
 Pálmi Gestsson as Sigurhjalti
 Björn Hlynur Haraldsson as Hreinn

See also
 List of submissions to the 93rd Academy Awards for Best International Feature Film
 List of Icelandic submissions for the Academy Award for Best International Feature Film

References

External links
 

2019 films
2019 drama films
Icelandic drama films
2010s Icelandic-language films